Robert P. Eldredge (1808 – November 25, 1884) was an American politician and lawyer who served as the fourth Secretary of State for the State of Michigan. 

Robert Eldredge was born in 1808 in the town of Greenwich in Washington County, New York. He travelled to the then Territory of Michigan in 1826, becoming the first lawyer of Macomb County before his appointment to Secretary of State for the State of Michigan.

Political Career 
Eldredge served as Secretary of State for the State of Michigan from 1842 to 1846 under Governor John S. Barry. Following this, he served two congressional sessions as a Senator representing Michigan's first congressional district.

References 

1808 births
1884 deaths
19th-century American politicians
19th-century American lawyers